The Nairobi Commuter Rail (NCR) is a network of diesel trains serving Nairobi and its suburbs. In 2020, 13,000 daily passengers used this service. After being modernized, the NCR was inaugurated by president Uhuru Kenyatta on 10 November 2020.

Services

Rolling Stock 
In April 2020 Kenya Railways acquired 11 refurbished diesel multiple units from Serveis Ferroviaris de Mallorca.

See also 
 Suburban railways in Africa
 Nairobi Light Rail

References 

Rail transport in Kenya
Railway companies of Kenya